Whitko Community School Corporation is a school district in northeast Indiana that serves areas of southwest Whitley and southeast Kosciusko counties, including the communities of South Whitley, Pierceton, Larwill, Sidney, and Collamer. The name is a combination of Whitley and Kosciusko.

Schools

External links
Whitko Schools Homepage

References

School districts in Indiana
Education in Whitley County, Indiana
Education in Kosciusko County, Indiana